"Sacris solemniis" is a hymn written by St. Thomas Aquinas (1225–1274) for the feast of Corpus Christi (also known as the Solemnity of the Holy Body and Blood of Christ).  The strophe of Sacris solemniis that begins with the words "Panis angelicus" (bread of angels) has often been set to music separately from the rest of the hymn. It appears about 1768 in the iberian musical form Vilancete/Villancico at Francesc Morera's "Si el grano divino". Most famously, in 1872 César Franck set this strophe for voice (tenor), harp, cello, and organ, and incorporated it into his Messe à trois voix Opus 12.   The hymn expresses the doctrine that the bread and wine are changed into the Body and Blood of Christ. In the Roman Catholic tradition the concept of transubstantiation is presented as an explanation of how this change happens.

The phenomenon whereby the strophe of Sacris solemniis that begins with the words "Panis angelicus" is often treated as a separate hymn has occurred also with other hymns that Thomas Aquinas wrote for Corpus Christi: Verbum supernum prodiens (the last two strophes beginning with "O salutaris hostia"), Adoro te devote (the strophe beginning with "Pie pelicane, Jesu Domine"), and Pange lingua gloriosi corporis mysterium (the last two strophes beginning with "Tantum ergo").

Latin text and English version

The Latin text below is from the Liturgy of the Hours. The English translation is a cento based upon a translation by John David Chambers (1805–1893).

TV and Movie
In the 4th episode of the first season of the 2022 television show, Night Sky the character Jude sings the first verse of Sacris Solemniis at a karaoke bar.

Text

See also 
 Adoro te devote
 Veni Sancte Spiritus
 Lauda Sion
 Pange lingua gloriosi corporis mysterium
 Verbum supernum prodiens

References

External links
 Sacris Solemniis in the Catholic Encyclopedia discusses the merits of a number of different translations.
 Another translation and historical explanation of the text
 Full text of Sacris solemniis, with an English translation
 Gregorian Chants
 

Eucharist in the Catholic Church
13th-century poems
Latin-language Christian hymns
13th-century Latin literature
Medieval literature
Hymns by Thomas Aquinas